Niño Jesús is an administrative neighborhood (barrio) of Madrid belonging to the district of Retiro. It is 0.643202 km² in size.

References 

Wards of Madrid
Retiro (Madrid)